The Kyiv summit in 3 February 2023 will be an important event in EU-Ukraine bilateral relations due to the Russian invasion of Ukraine in 2022. The meeting will be hosted by the President of Ukraine Volodymyr Zelenskyy. The President of the European Council Charles Michel, the President of the European Commission Ursula von der Leyen and some senior officials from Brussels will also attend the event.

References

Links 
 EU-Ukraine Summit 2023, EU Council website 

EU-Ukraine Summit, 2023
EU summit 2023
Events affected by the 2022 Russian invasion of Ukraine
Diplomatic conferences in Ukraine
21st-century diplomatic conferences (Europe)
EU-Ukraine Summit, 2023
EU-Ukraine Summit, 2023
EU-Ukraine Summit, 2023
Ukraine–European Union relations
February 2023 events in Europe